Suffolk Executive Airport  is a general aviation airport located in Suffolk, Virginia. The airport is also the site of Skydive Suffolk and the annual Suffolk Peanut Fest.

Accidents and incidents
On May 8, 2021, a woman suffered serious injuries after hitting the roof of a hangar while skydiving at the airport. Suffolk Fire & Rescue personnel used a ladder truck with a platform to rescue her.

See also
List of airports in Virginia

References

External links

Airports in Virginia